Corynoptera is a genus of fungus gnats in the family Sciaridae.

Species
 Corynoptera abducera Mohrig & Rulik, 1999
 Corynoptera adustula Hippa, Vilkamaa & Heller, 2010
 Corynoptera aequispina Hippa, Vilkamaa & Heller, 2010
 Corynoptera alneti Hippa, Vilkamaa & Heller, 2010
 Corynoptera alticola (Kieffer, 1919)
 Corynoptera anae Mohrig & Heller, 1992
 Corynoptera andalusica Hippa, Vilkamaa & Heller, 2010
 Corynoptera angustior Hippa, Vilkamaa & Heller, 2010
 Corynoptera anodon Hippa, Vilkamaa & Heller, 2010
 Corynoptera applanata Mohrig & Dimitrova, 1992
 Corynoptera arboris Fritz, 1982
 Corynoptera badia Hippa, Vilkamaa & Heller, 2010
 Corynoptera bernardoensis Mohrig & Röschmann, 1993
 Corynoptera bicuspidata (Lengersdorf, 1926)
 Corynoptera bipartita Mohrig & Krivosheina, 1985
 Corynoptera bistrispina (Bukowski & Lengersdorf, 1936)
 Corynoptera boletiphaga (Lengersdorf, 1940)
 Corynoptera breviformis Mohrig & Krivosheina, 1983
 Corynoptera caesula Hippa & Menzel
 Corynoptera caustica Mohrig & Röschmann, 1996
 Corynoptera chaetospina Mohrig & Röschmann, 1996
 Corynoptera cincinnata Mohrig & Blasco-Zumeta, 1996
 Corynoptera collicola Hippa, Vilkamaa & Heller, 2010
 Corynoptera condyloma Hippa, Vilkamaa & Heller, 2010
 Corynoptera confirmata Mohrig, 1985
 Corynoptera consumpta (Freeman, 1987)
 Corynoptera controversa Hippa, Vilkamaa & Heller, 2010
 Corynoptera contusa Mohrig, 1994
 Corynoptera curvapex Hippa, Vilkamaa & Heller, 2010
 Corynoptera curvispinosa Freeman, 1983
 Corynoptera decepta Hippa, Vilkamaa & Heller, 2010
 Corynoptera defecta (Frey, 1948)
 Corynoptera digemina Hippa, Vilkamaa & Heller, 2010
 Corynoptera diligenta Rudzinski, 2008
 Corynoptera dioon Hippa, Vilkamaa & Heller, 2010
 Corynoptera distenta Hippa, Vilkamaa & Heller, 2010
 Corynoptera dubitata Tuomikoski, 1960
 Corynoptera exerta Hippa, Vilkamaa & Heller, 2010
 Corynoptera fimbriata Hippa, Vilkamaa & Heller, 2010
 Corynoptera flava Hippa, Vilkamaa & Heller, 2010
 Corynoptera flavicauda (Zetterstedt, 1855)
 Corynoptera flavosignata Menzel & Heller, 2006
 Corynoptera francescae Mohrig & Kauschke, 1994
 Corynoptera furcifera Mohrig & Mamaev, 1987
 Corynoptera gemellata Hippa, Vilkamaa & Heller, 2010
 Corynoptera grothae Mohrig & Menzel, 1990
 Corynoptera hemiacantha Mohrig & Mamaev, 1992
 Corynoptera hypopygialis (Lengersdorf, 1926)
 Corynoptera iberica Hippa, Vilkamaa & Heller, 2010
 Corynoptera inclinata Hippa, Vilkamaa & Heller, 2010
 Corynoptera inexspectata Tuomikoski, 1960
 Corynoptera irmgardis (Lengersdorf, 1930)
 Corynoptera karlkulbei Mohrig & Röschmann, 1996
 Corynoptera latibula Hippa & Menzel
 Corynoptera levis Tuomikoski, 1960
 Corynoptera lobata Hippa, Vilkamaa & Heller, 2010
 Corynoptera luteofusca (Bukowski & Lengersdorf, 1936)
 Corynoptera macricula Mohrig & Krivosheina, 1986
 Corynoptera marinae Mohrig & Krivosheina, 1986
 Corynoptera mediana Mohrig & Mamaev, 1982
 Corynoptera melanochaeta Mohrig & Menzel, 1992
 Corynoptera membranigera (Kieffer, 1903)
 Corynoptera micula Hippa, Vilkamaa & Heller, 2010
 Corynoptera minax Hippa, Vilkamaa & Heller, 2010
 Corynoptera minima (Meigen, 1818)
 Corynoptera montana (Winnertz, 1869)
 Corynoptera nigrocauda Mohrig and Menzel, 1990
 Corynoptera ninae Hippa, Vilkamaa & Heller, 2010
 Corynoptera pacifica Hippa, Vilkamaa & Heller, 2010
 Corynoptera paracantha Hippa, Vilkamaa & Heller, 2010
 Corynoptera parcitata Mohrig & Mamaev, 1986
 Corynoptera patula Hippa, Vilkamaa & Heller, 2010
 Corynoptera perornata Mohrig & Röschmann, 1993
 Corynoptera perpusilla Winnertz, 1867
 Corynoptera phili Hippa, Vilkamaa & Heller, 2010
 Corynoptera plusiochaeta Hippa, Vilkamaa & Heller, 2010
 Corynoptera polana Rudzinski, 2009
 Corynoptera praefurcifera Mohrig, 1994
 Corynoptera praevia (Mohrig & Menzel, 1992)
 Corynoptera primoriensis Hippa, Vilkamaa & Heller, 2010
 Corynoptera redunca Hippa, Vilkamaa & Heller, 2010
 Corynoptera roeschmanni Mohrig & Rulik, 2001
 Corynoptera romana Hippa, Vilkamaa & Heller, 2010
 Corynoptera saccata Tuomikoski, 1960
 Corynoptera saetistyla Mohrig & Krivosheina, 1985
 Corynoptera sedula Mohrig & Krivosheina, 1985
 Corynoptera semipedestris Mohrig & Blasco-Zumeta, 1996
 Corynoptera semisaccata Mohrig & Mamaev, 1987
 Corynoptera serotina Hippa, Vilkamaa & Heller, 2010
 Corynoptera setosa Freeman, 1983
 Corynoptera sinedens Hippa, Vilkamaa & Heller, 2010
 Corynoptera sphaerula Hippa, Vilkamaa & Heller, 2010
 Corynoptera sphenoptera Tuomikoski, 1960
 Corynoptera spiciceps Hippa, Vilkamaa & Heller, 2010
 Corynoptera spicigera Hippa, Vilkamaa & Heller, 2010
 Corynoptera stellaris Hippa, Vilkamaa & Heller, 2010
 Corynoptera stipidaria Mohrig, 1994
 Corynoptera subclinochaeta Hippa, Vilkamaa & Heller, 2010
 Corynoptera subfurcifera Mohrig & Hövemeyer, 1992
 Corynoptera subpiniphila Mohrig & Mamaev, 1992
 Corynoptera subsaccata Mohrig & Krivosheina, 1982
 Corynoptera subsedula Mohrig & Mamaev, 1987
 Corynoptera subtetrachaeta Komarova, 1995
 Corynoptera subtilis (Lengersdorf, 1929)
 Corynoptera syriaca (Lengersdorf, 1934)
 Corynoptera tarda Hippa, Vilkamaa & Heller, 2010
 Corynoptera tetrachaeta Tuomikoski, 1960
 Corynoptera tiliacea Komarova, 2000
 Corynoptera trepida (Winnertz, 1867)
 Corynoptera triacantha Tuomikoski, 1960
 Corynoptera trichistylis Hippa, Vilkamaa & Heller, 2010
 Corynoptera tridentata Hondru, 1968
 Corynoptera truncatula Hippa, Vilkamaa & Heller, 2010
 Corynoptera tumidula Hippa, Vilkamaa & Heller, 2010
 Corynoptera turkmenica Antonova, 1975
 Corynoptera umbrata Hippa & Menzel
 Corynoptera uncata Menzel & Smith, 2006
 Corynoptera uncinula Hippa, Vilkamaa & Heller, 2010
 Corynoptera undulosa Hippa & Menzel
 Corynoptera voluptuosa Mohrig & Mamaev, 1987
 Corynoptera vulcani Hippa, Vilkamaa & Heller, 2010
 Corynoptera waltraudis Mohrig & Mamaev, 1987
 Corynoptera warnckei Rudzinski, 2006

References

Sciaridae
Bibionomorpha genera